United Nations Security Council resolution 2500 was adopted in 2019.

See also
 List of United Nations Security Council Resolutions 2401 to 2500 (2018–2019)

References

External links
Text of the Resolution at undocs.org

 2500
December 2019 events
 2500
2019 in Somalia